Neuschönau is a municipality in the district of Freyung-Grafenau, in the Lower Bavaria region of Bavaria, in Germany.

Points of interest
 Botanischer Garten der Nationalpark Bayerischer Wald  — botanical garden.
 Lusen National Park Centre
Baumwipfelpfad Neuschönau — tall contemporary wooden tower, with a spiral ramp for treetop walking.
Hans-Eisenmann-Haus — visitor centre.

Gallery

References

Freyung-Grafenau